The 1982–83 Women's IHF Cup was the second edition of the competition, taking place between October 1982 and 1 May 1983. A round of 16 was introduced as the tournament was expanded from 11 to 17 teams, with Austria, Czechoslovakia, Denmark, Portugal, Spain and Switzerland making their debut. Avtomobilist Baku became the first Soviet team to win the competition by beating Empor Rostock in the final, while TJ Topolniky and TC Veszprém also reached the semifinals and defending champion RK Trešnjevka was defeated by compatriot Sekulić Sombor in the Round of 16.

Preliminary round

Round of 16

Quarter-finals

Semifinals

Final

References

Women's EHF Cup
1982 in handball
1983 in handball